Smardaea is a genus of fungi in the family Pyronemataceae.

The genus was circumscribed by Mirko Svrček in Ceská Mykol. vol.23 on page 90 in 1969.

The genus name of Smardaea is in honour of František Šmarda (1902–1976), who was a Moravian-Czech botanist and mycologist, also teacher in Brünn.

Species
As accepted by Species Fungorum;
 Smardaea amethystina 
 Smardaea australis 
 Smardaea marchica 
 Smardaea microspora 
 Smardaea ovalispora 
 Smardaea planchonis 
 Smardaea protea 
 Smardaea purpurea 
 Smardaea reticulosperma 
 Smardaea verrucispora

References

External links
Index Fungorum

Pyronemataceae
Pezizales genera